Sahneh County is in Kermanshah province, Iran. The capital of the county is the city of Sahneh. At the 2006 census, the county's population was 75,827 in 19,106 households. The following census in 2011 counted 76,678 people in 22,052 households. At the 2016 census, the county's population was 70,757 in 21,788 households.

Administrative divisions

The population history of Sahneh County's administrative divisions over three consecutive censuses is shown in the following table. The latest census shows two districts, seven rural districts, and two cities.

References

 

Counties of Kermanshah Province